Acrostira is a genus of grasshopers in the subfamily Pamphaginae, with species found in the Canary Islands.

Species 

The following species are recognised in the genus Acrostira:

 Acrostira bellamyi (Uvarov, 1922)
 Acrostira euphorbiae Garcia-Becerra & Oromí, 1992
 Acrostira tamarani Baez, 1984
 Acrostira tenerifae Perez & López, 2005

References 

Pamphagidae
Fauna of the Canary Islands
Orthoptera genera
Taxa named by Günther Enderlein